The Aegis  may refer to:
The Aegis (newspaper) - a local newspaper for Harford County, Maryland, USA
The Aegis (magazine) - a former London-based magazine
Aegis (newspaper) - a high school newspaper in Oakland, California